Linda Diane Creed (December 6, 1948 – April 10, 1986), also known by her married name Linda Epstein, was an American songwriter and lyricist who teamed up with Thom Bell to produce some of the most successful Philadelphia soul groups of the 1970s.

Career
Born in the Mount Airy section of Philadelphia in December 1948, Creed was active in music at Germantown High School. After graduation, Creed decided against college and devoted her energies to writing and producing music.  Her career was launched in 1970 when singer Dusty Springfield recorded her song "Free Girl". That same year, Creed teamed with Bell, a staff writer, producer, and arranger at Kenny Gamble and Leon Huff's record label Philadelphia International Records.

Their first songwriting collaboration, "Stop, Look, Listen (To Your Heart)", became a Top 40 pop hit for the Stylistics, beginning an extended collaboration that also yielded the group's most successful recordings, including "You Are Everything", "Betcha by Golly, Wow", "Break Up to Make Up", "People Make the World Go Round", "You Make Me Feel Brand New", and "I'm Stone in Love with You" (the latter with Thom Bell).  Creed and Bell also paired on a number of hits for the Spinners, including "Ghetto Child", "I'm Coming Home", "Living a Little, Laughing a Little", and "The Rubberband Man". Linda Creed also worked with fellow Pennsylvania native Phyllis Hyman on many of her songs, most notably "Old Friend".

Death
Though diagnosed with breast cancer at 26, Creed kept on working, teaming with composer Michael Masser and writing the lyrics to the song "The Greatest Love of All", the main theme of the film The Greatest, a biopic of the great boxer Muhammad Ali, launched in 1977. The song was originally recorded by George Benson and released as a single in 1977, becoming a big hit, peaked at #2 on the R&B chart. The lyrics of the song were written in the midst of her struggle with breast cancer. The words describe her feelings about coping with great challenges that one must face in life, being strong during those challenges whether you succeed or fail, and passing that strength on to children to carry with them into their adult lives. In December 1984, the song was recorded  by Whitney Houston for her 1985 self-titled debut album and it would top the charts in May 1986. Weeks before Houston reached number one, Creed died of breast cancer on April 10, 1986, at the age of 37. She was survived by her husband, Stephen "Eppy" Epstein, a longtime music promoter around Philadelphia, and their two daughters, Roni Lee and Dana Creed.

The following year, her family and friends established the Linda Creed Breast Cancer Organization in her honor, and it serves women in Pennsylvania and the surrounding counties.

In 1992, she was posthumously inducted into the Songwriters Hall of Fame.

Selcted songwriting credits
"The Greatest Love of All" – originally recorded in 1977 by George Benson; later covered by Whitney Houston in 1986
"Stop, Look, Listen (To Your Heart)" – originally recorded by The Stylistics also covered by Diana Ross & Marvin Gaye.
"You Are Everything" – originally recorded by The Stylistics also covered by Diana Ross & Marvin Gaye.
"Betcha by Golly, Wow" – originally recorded by Connie Stevens as "Keep Growing Strong", later made famous by The Stylistics, later covered by Phyllis Hyman and Prince
"People Make the World Go Round" – The Stylistics, Angela Bofill, Michael Jackson
"I'm Stone in Love with You" – originally recorded by The Stylistics
"Break Up to Make Up" – originally recorded by The Stylistics,Will Downing
"Rockin' Roll Baby" – originally recorded by The Stylistics
"You Make Me Feel Brand New" – originally recorded by The Stylistics
"Ghetto Child" – originally recorded by The Spinners
"I'm Coming Home" – originally recorded by Johnny Mathis, later covered by The Spinners
 "Life Is a Song Worth Singing" – originally recorded by Johnny Mathis, later covered by Teddy Pendergrass
"Living a Little, Laughing a Little" – originally recorded by The Spinners
"The Rubberband Man" – originally recorded by The Spinners
"Old Friend" – originally recorded by Phyllis Hyman
"Half Crazy" – originally recorded by Johnny Gill
"Hold Me" – Teddy Pendergrass (duet with Whitney Houston)
"Love Don't Love Nobody" – The Spinners
"Help Me Find a Way (To Say I Love You) Little Anthony & The Imperials
"If I Love You"- originally recorded by Little Anthony & The Imperials, later covered by The Stylistics

References

External links
 
 Linda Creed at Soul Walking
 
 
 Linda Creed Breast Cancer Organization website
 Linda Creed BCO promo videos: 2015 and 2019

1948 births
1986 deaths
Deaths from breast cancer
Musicians from Philadelphia
American lyricists
Jewish American songwriters
Songwriters from Pennsylvania
Deaths from cancer in Pennsylvania
20th-century American singers
Singers from Pennsylvania
20th-century American women singers